Bartonella vinsonii is a gram-negative bacteria from the genus Bartonella which was isolated from dogs Rochalimaea vinsonii was reclassified to Bartonella vinsonii. B. vinsonii contains three validly published subspecies B. vinsonii subsp. arupensis, B. vinsonii subsp. berkhoffii, and B. vinsonii subsp. vinsonii, and one effectively published B. vinsonii subsp. yucatanensis. B. vinsonii subsp. vinsonii has been isolated from voles and B. vinsonii subsp. berkhofli was isolated from a dog with endocarditis. B. vinsonii subsp. berkhoffii can cause diseases in humans. Those two subspecies are named after J. William Vinson and Herman A. Berkhoff.

References

 

Bartonellaceae
Bacteria described in 1993